David Cowan (1742 – 24 September 1808) was a Scottish farmer, naval officer, ship's captain, ferry operator and political figure in Upper Canada. He represented Essex County in the Legislative Assembly of Upper Canada from 1804 to 1808.

He was born in Lanarkshire and emigrated to the Thirteen Colonies in 1770, serving as gardener for George Washington at Mount Vernon. Cowan served as a lieutenant in the Royal Navy during the American Revolution and went on to serve in the Provincial Marine for Upper Canada, commanding ships on the Great Lakes. He lived in Fort Erie and then Amherstburg. Cowan also owned property in Kingston.

Cowan is credited with bringing the first apple trees to the state of Michigan in 1796, a variety similar to the Red Calville which he brought to Detroit.

Cowan died on board the Camden in Fort Erie harbour.

References

Further reading 
Becoming Prominent: Leadership in Upper Canada, 1791-1841, J.K. Johnson (1989) pp. 184–5

1742 births
1808 deaths
18th-century Canadian politicians
18th-century Scottish people
Lanarkshire
Royal Navy personnel of the American Revolutionary War
Members of the Legislative Assembly of Upper Canada
Royal Navy officers
Scottish businesspeople
18th-century Scottish farmers
Scottish gardeners
Scottish emigrants to the United States
Scottish emigrants to pre-Confederation Ontario
Scottish sailors
British emigrants to the Thirteen Colonies
19th-century Scottish farmers